Umberto Cerati (24 March 1911 – 23 July 1994) was an Italian long-distance runner who competed at the 1936 Summer Olympics.

References

External links
 

1911 births
1994 deaths
Athletes (track and field) at the 1936 Summer Olympics
Italian male long-distance runners
Olympic athletes of Italy